Howard Sherman may refer to:

 Sherman Howard (Howard Lee Sherman, born 1949), American actor
 Howard Sherman (cricketer) (born 1943), former English cricketer
 Howard Sherman (comics)